Tucker Point is an ice-covered point on the west side of Murray Foreland, Martin Peninsula, 12 nautical miles (22 km) southwest of Cape Herlacher, on the Bakutis Coast, Marie Byrd Land. Mapped by United States Geological Survey (USGS) from surveys and U.S. Navy aerial photographs, 1959–67. Named by Advisory Committee on Antarctic Names (US-ACAN) in 1977 after Robert L. Tucker, United States Navy meteorologist on nine deployments of Operation Deepfreeze through 1976.

Headlands of Marie Byrd Land